Monte Bove is an ice-capped mountain at the eastern end of the Cordillera Darwin, Chile. The summit was reached for the first time in 1963 by a team led by Eric Shipton. The second recorded ascent of Monte Bove was made in 1990.

References

Mountains of Chile
Landforms of Magallanes Region
Isla Grande de Tierra del Fuego